The RAD5500 is a radiation-hardened 64-bit processor core design created by BAE Systems Electronics, Intelligence & Support based on the PowerPC e5500 designed by IBM and Freescale Semiconductor.  Successor of the RAD750, the RAD5500 processor platform is for use in high radiation environments experienced on board satellites and spacecraft.

The RAD5500 core supports VPX high speed connectors, DDR2/DDR3 memory, serialize/deserialize (SerDes), and SpaceWire IO.

Processors 

The RAD5500 core is based on those of the Freescale Semiconductor e5500-based QorIQ system-on-chip. The RAD5510, RAD5515, RAD5545, and RADSPEED-HB (host bridge) are four system on a chip processors implemented with RAD5500 cores produced with 45 nm SOI technology from the IBM Trusted Foundry.

RAD5510 and RAD5515 
The RAD5510 and RAD5515 processors employ a single RAD5500 core and are intended for medium processing capability in environments that require low power consumption (11.5 and 13.7 watts respectively).  This processor provides up to 1.4 giga operations per second (GOPS) and 0.9 GFLOPS of performance.

RAD5545 
The RAD5545 processor employs four RAD5500 cores, achieving performance characteristics of up to 5.6 giga-operations per second (GOPS) and over 3.7 GFLOPS. Power consumption is 20 watts with all peripherals operating.

RADSPEED-HB (host bridge) 
Based on the RAD5545, the RADSPEED-HB is intended for host processing and data management support for one to four RADSPEED DSPs.  The RADSPEED-HB replaces a secondary DDR2/DDR3 memory interface connection found on the RAD5545 with connections for RADSPEED DSPs instead.  (Note that RADSPEED DSPs are entirely different processors that are specialized for digital signal processing and are not to be confused with the RADSPEED-HB, which serves as a host bridge.)

Single-board computer 

The RAD5545 SpaceVPX single-board computer is for use in the harsh environmental conditions of outer space; designed for operating in temperatures between −55 °C and 125 °C and radiation-hardened for a total ionizing dose of 100 krad (for the silicon chips). It is a 6U-220 format module, compliant to the ANSI/VITA 78.00 SpaceVPX standard, and includes either a RAD5515 or RAD5545 processor. The RAD5545 SpaceVPX single-board computer is produced BAE Systems's facility in Manassas, Virginia, which is a U.S. Department of Defense Category 1A Microelectronics Trusted Source.

See also 
 QorIQ P5 series
 PowerPC e5500

References 

Avionics computers
BAE Systems
Microcomputers
Power microprocessors
Radiation-hardened microprocessors
Single-board computers